En Vivo (English: Live) is the second live album by Mexican pop singer Mijares. This album was released in 2001 and it was produced by Manuel Mijares himself. It's kind of collection of his greatest hits. His special guest was his wife. This concert was recorded in the Auditorio Nacional of Mexico City between January 27/28, 2001.

Track listing
Tracks:
 No Se Murió el Amor
 Corazón Salvaje
 Que Nada Nos Separe
 Popurri: Tan Solo/Me Acordaré de Ti/Siempre
 Bella
 Bonita
 El Breve Espacio
 Te Extraño
 Soldado del Amor
 Cuando Me Vaya
 No Hace Falta
 Para Amarnos Más
 El Privilegio de Amar (feat. Lucero)
 Uno Entre Mil

Controversy
Because of this disc, Mijares and Universal Music Group received a lawsuit from EMI Music, since EMI stated that they had to receive the royalties from the old songs that Mijares recorded when he was with them. The lawsuit never proceeded and it was canceled.

Manuel Mijares albums
2001 live albums
Albums recorded at the Auditorio Nacional (Mexico)